Victor James Santiago, Jr. (born September 6, 1977), better known by his stage name N.O.R.E. (or Noreaga), is an American rapper and broadcaster. Born and raised in Queens, New York, Santiago first rose to prominence as one half of the East Coast hip hop duo Capone-N-Noreaga (C-N-N), alongside fellow Queens-based rapper Capone. He would also have success as a solo artist with the singles "Superthug", "Banned from T.V." (featuring Big Pun, Nature, Cam'ron, Jadakiss, and Styles P), "Nothin'" (featuring Pharrell) and "Oye Mi Canto".

Santiago has released music under various record labels, including Penalty, Roc-La-Familia, Def Jam, and Babygrande Records. In June 2011, it was announced Santiago partnered with fellow American rapper Busta Rhymes' Conglomerate label, where he released his 2013 album Student of the Game, issued under E1 Music. Santiago is also chief executive officer (CEO) of his own label imprint, Militainment Business.

Outside of music, Santiago is the co-host (with DJ EFN) of the talk show/podcast Drink Champs, which centers around celebrity interviews. The show has been described as "The Premier Hip Hop Interview Show" and has won "Best Hip Hop Platform" at the 2022 BET Hip Hop Awards.

Early life
Santiago was born to an African American mother and a Puerto Rican father.

Musical career

1995–1997: Career beginnings with Capone

Santiago's career began to take off in 1995, while under the pseudonym Noreaga (after Panamanian ruler Manuel Noriega) as part of the duo Capone-N-Noreaga alongside friend and fellow Queens-based rapper Capone, whom he met while serving time in prison. Santiago grew up in LeFrak City and spent time hanging out in Capone’s neighbouring Queensbridge Houses. They signed to Penalty Recordings in 1996, and released their debut album The War Report, in 1997. The War Report was a commercial and critical success that made the duo well known among hip hop audiences. The album received praise for using the "traditional grimey boom-bap" sound of classic New York City hip hop, which at that time was falling out in favor of a more futuristic sound. The album peaked at #21 on the Billboard 200, and the singles "Illegal Life", "Closer", and "T.O.N.Y. (Top of New York)" all charted on the Hot R&B/Hip-Hop Singles and Tracks chart.

1997–2000: Solo career and debut album
Following the release of the album, Capone was again sentenced to a jail term, which left Noreaga to take on a solo career and make an album on his own. Noreaga's solo debut studio album N.O.R.E, was released in 1998. The title, a shortening of the artist's name, used the backronym "Niggaz on (the) Run Eatin'". The album became even more successful than the duo's debut, charting at #3 on the Billboard 200 and being certified platinum by the Recording Industry Association of America (RIAA). The album features guest appearances from fellow NYC rappers Nas, Kool G Rap, Big Pun and Busta Rhymes. It also features in many cases a different production style than The War Report, including the modern futuristic sound, with tracks produced by then-up-and-coming producers The Neptunes and Swizz Beatz. The Neptunes produced the hit "Superthug", which reached #36 on the Billboard Hot 100 and #1 on the Hot Rap Tracks chart. The song, along with Mase's hit "Lookin' At Me", was one of the Neptunes' first major productions.

In 1999, Noreaga would go on to release his second solo album, Melvin Flynt - Da Hustler, which was a moderate success, reaching the top 10 of the Billboard 200 and becoming certified gold by the RIAA. The album's most successful single (produced by The Neptunes) was "Oh No", which reached #49 on the Hot R&B/Hip-Hop Singles and Tracks chart. Capone was released from prison in 1999. The two subsequently began recording music together again and released their second C-N-N album in the year 2000. The album, titled The Reunion, was not well-received critically and failed to match the commercial success of the duo's debut or Noreaga's solo albums. AllMusic reviewer Matt Conaway summed up the album by stating "With The Reunion, Capone-N-Noreaga take a step backward." The group would then go on a hiatus and not release another album until 2009.

2001–2007: Name change and reggaeton era
Noreaga continued to pursue his career as a solo artist. He officially changed his stage name to N.O.R.E., and after some delays, his third solo studio album God's Favorite, was released in 2002. The album peaked at #3 on the Billboard 200 and was later certified platinum. It contained the major hit Nothin'" (produced by The Neptunes), which reached #10 on the Billboard Hot 100. It became N.O.R.E.'s highest-charting hit.

Following God's Favorite, N.O.R.E. changed his musical focus. He began recording Spanish-language songs to reflect his Puerto Rican background and made reggaeton music, rather than traditional hip hop. The reggaeton single "Oye Mi Canto", was released in 2004 and became a major hit, peaking at #12 on the Billboard Hot 100. The song was originally supposed to be a single from an upcoming album titled 1 Fan a Day, but the album was never released. Instead, N.O.R.E. released a reggaeton/hip hop album in 2006, titled N.O.R.E. y la Familia...Ya Tú Sabe, which included the lead singles "Oye Mi Canto" and "Mas Maiz". The album, released under Jay-Z's Roc-La-Familia, has both English and Spanish language tracks. It did not chart nearly as well as any of N.O.R.E.'s previous solo albums, as it only reached #82 on the Billboard 200. He also is a playable character in Def Jam Vendetta and Def Jam Fight for New York.

N.O.R.E. went on to release two more solo albums. The first, his fifth album Noreality, was released in 2007 and supported by the single "Set It Off", featuring vocals and production from Swizz Beatz. N.O.R.E. released his CD/DVD, Noreality, in September via a joint venture with his own Thugged Out Militainment label and Babygrande Records. The album features guest appearances from Jadakiss, Three 6 Mafia, Kanye West, Pharrell, Mobb Deep's Prodigy, Bun B, Tru Life, David Banner, Kurupt and Capone. Swizz Beatz is among the producers. The DVD, which was available in limited quantities, is based on the rapper's life.

The second album S.O.R.E., was controversially released in 2009. N.O.R.E. would go on to denounce S.O.R.E., calling it an album he had nothing to do with and asked fans not to purchase it. The album is a reference to his stage name and his first album which is a backronym for "Niggaz on (the) Run Eatin'", which makes "S.O.R.E.", "Still on (the) Run Eatin'". The term was first used in late 2007, when N.O.R.E. released a song entitled "Still on the Run Eatin'", featuring Lil Wayne. N.O.R.E. said in a video blog that he didn't approve of this album. He also stated the album's artwork was of him at 310 pounds, adding he had lost 62 pounds since then. He also went on to mention five songs on the album were actually handed in, while the rest were pulled off the internet, some of which came from 2007, probably stemming from label financial issues. He later stated he was working on an album known as N.O.R.E. Pt. 2: Born Again, later retitled Student of the Game.

2009–present: Student of the Game 
In 2009, N.O.R.E. collaborated with Capone once again, to release their third studio album Channel 10, which charted at #136 on the Billboard 200. In 2010, a fourth Capone-N-Noreaga album titled The War Report 2, was released. Its lead single was "Hood Pride", featuring Faith Evans. In June 2011, fellow American rapper Busta Rhymes, with whom N.O.R.E. has collaborated several times in the past, stated on his Twitter account that he had officially signed N.O.R.E. to his newly founded record label Conglomerate Records.

Between 2009 and 2011, N.O.R.E. teamed up with DJ EFN to host a satellite radio show for Sirius XM called Militainment Crazy Raw Radio, a title that gave equal weight to N.O.R.E.'s Militainment brand, to EFN's Crazy Hood, and to 66 Raw, the channel on Sirius XM which carried the show.

In early 2013, Santiago stated that he would yet again change his moniker, this time to P.A.P.I. (Acronym for Power Always Proves Intelligence), which stirred mixed reactions from his fans. On April 16, 2013 he released Student of the Game, and shortly after announced a sequel would be released as his next album.

On September 27, 2013, he told MTV that his next album, Melvin Flynt II: Da Final Hustle will be his final album. He stated he will stop touring and releasing solo albums to focus on being a music executive and CEO. On October 30, 2015, Santiago tweeted: "New and last album in July!!!", followed by "Melvin Flynt 2? Or N.O.R.E. 2?".

N.O.R.E. reunited with DJ EFN to begin hosting the "Drink Champs" podcast in March 2016. Celebrity hip-hop guests are featured in most episodes, sharing stories and updates while drinking alcohol. The podcast has achieved more than five million listens per month. Since November 2016, the show has been aired on Revolt.

Legal troubles
On February 24, 2009, N.O.R.E. was arrested at a Fatburger hamburger restaurant in Miami Beach, FL, following a fight with a customer.

Discography

Studio albums
 N.O.R.E. (1998)
 Melvin Flynt – Da Hustler (1999)
 God's Favorite (2002)
 N.O.R.E. y la Familia...Ya Tú Sabe  (2006)
 Noreality (2007)
 Student of the Game (2013)
 5E (2018)

References

External links
 N.O.R.E. on Discogs
 
 N.O.R.E. Feb 2010 UK radio Interview (CWR Radio)

1977 births
Living people
African-American male rappers
African-American Muslims
American people of Puerto Rican descent
East Coast hip hop musicians
Hispanic and Latino American rappers
Five percenters
People from Queens, New York
Rappers from New York City
Gangsta rappers
21st-century American rappers
21st-century American male musicians
21st-century African-American musicians
20th-century African-American people